Barbara Bujka (born 5 September 1986, Budapest) is a Hungarian female water polo player. At the 2012 Summer Olympics, she competed for the Hungary women's national water polo team in the women's event. She is 5 ft 8.5 inches tall. In 2013–14 season she played for Olympiacos in Greece, winning both the LEN Trophy and the Greek Championship.

She was part of the German women's national water polo team at the 2003 World Aquatics Championships,

See also
 Hungary women's Olympic water polo team records and statistics
 List of women's Olympic water polo tournament top goalscorers
 List of World Aquatics Championships medalists in water polo

References

External links
 

Hungarian female water polo players
1986 births
Living people
Olympiacos Women's Water Polo Team players
Olympic water polo players of Hungary
Water polo players at the 2012 Summer Olympics
Water polo players at the 2016 Summer Olympics
Water polo players from Budapest
World Aquatics Championships medalists in water polo
Universiade medalists in water polo
Universiade silver medalists for Hungary
Medalists at the 2009 Summer Universiade
21st-century Hungarian women
Expatriate water polo players
Hungarian expatriate sportspeople in Greece
Hungarian expatriate sportspeople in Italy
Hungarian expatriate sportspeople in Germany
Hungarian expatriate sportspeople in the Netherlands